Cootamundra–Gundagai Regional Council (CGRC) is a local government area located in the South West Slopes and Riverina regions of New South Wales, Australia. The council was formed on 12 May 2016 through a merger of the Cootamundra and Gundagai shires. Originally named Gundagai Council, the name was changed to Cootamundra–Gundagai Regional Council on 7 September 2016.

The first mayor of the Cootamundra–Gundagai Regional Council was Councillor Abb McAlister, who was elected after the inaugural Cootamundra–Gundagai Regional Council election which was held on 9 September 2017.

The second and current mayor of the Cootamundra–Gundagai Regional Council is Councillor Charlie Sheahan, who was elected after the NSW Local Government Election which was held on 4 December 2021.

Controversy at creation 
Around the same time as the state government was announcing the mergers of shires and councils, the mayor of the Gundagai Shire, Abb McAlister, lodged papers with the Land and Environment Court of New South Wales to prevent it.

Signs protesting the amalgamation were prominently displayed throughout Gundagai for several years.

Towns and localities 
The following towns and localities are located within Cootamundra-Gundagai Council:

Demographics 
The population for the predecessor councils was estimated in 2015 as:
  in Cootamundra Shire and
  in Gundagai Shire.

Council
The CGRC consists of nine Councillors elected proportionally in a single ward.

The inaugural councillors were expected to be elected for a fixed four-year term of office by the Local Government Elections held on 9 September 2017. Due to the COVID-19 Pandemic, the councillors served a slightly longer term as the elections were postponed to 4 December 2021.

The second council was elected on 4 December 2021, with the final results declared on 20 December 2021. These councillors was sworn in at an extraordinary meeting held on 10 January 2022 and will serve for 2 years and 3/4 to realign the election calendar to the original plan. The next election will take place in September of 2024.

The most recent election was held on 4 December 2021, and the makeup of the council is as follows:

History 
While the two former councils of the Cootamundra Shire & the Gundagai Shire were being amalgamated, Christine Ferguson was appointed as council administrator and Ken Tretheway was appointed as Interim General Manager at the creation of the new council. Ferguson is a farmer in the Gundagai area and former state president of the National Party. She had also been a councillor of Gundagai Shire during the 1990s.

The inaugural council and its first election was held on 9 September 2017, and the makeup of that council is as follows:

See also

 Local government areas of New South Wales

References

Local government areas of New South Wales
2016 establishments in Australia
Cootamundra-Gundagai Regional Council